Follow the Leader (stylized as FOLLOW The LEADEЯ) is the third studio album by American nu metal band Korn. The album was released on August 18, 1998, through Immortal/Epic. This was their first album not produced by Ross Robinson. Instead, it was produced by Steve Thompson and Toby Wright.

The album peaked at number one on four charts, including the Billboard 200 with 268,000 units sold in its first week of release, Follow the Leader is the band's most commercially–successful album, being certified five-times Platinum by the RIAA. Its singles, "Got the Life" and "Freak on a Leash", both charted on more than three charts, and their music videos are considered to be the first music videos retired from MTV, most notably the MTV show Total Request Live. The album generally received positive reviews by critics and sold around 14 million copies worldwide. Korn was praised by AllMusic saying the album is "an effective follow-up to their first two alt-metal landmarks."

The Family Values Tour promoted the album, along with its five singles. The song "Freak on a Leash" was nominated for nine MTV Video Music Awards, and won for the Best Rock Video award, as well as Best Editing. The music video for "Freak on a Leash" won Best Short Form Music Video at the 2000 Grammy Awards.

Recording and production 
By early 1998, Korn returned to the studio to record Follow the Leader. Even though Korn was impressed by the work Ross Robinson had done on their previous albums, they decided to work with Steve Thompson and Toby Wright. Robinson did, however, work with singer Jonathan Davis as a vocal coach for the album. According to Wright, Robinson went to extreme lengths to agitate Davis in the vocal booth, including punching him in the back repeatedly. Korn implemented a live streaming department on their website in March 1998, called Korn TV, which aired the After-School Special series. Using RealMedia software, fans could access it every Thursday from 7:30 pm to 8:30 pm  Eastern time. Korn's After-School Special featured guest appearances such as Sugar Ray, Limp Bizkit, Deftones, Steve Vai, 311, and the Pharcyde. The band was shown making the record on Korn TV. Korn exposed themselves making the album to let their fans see what they were doing in the studio and behind the scenes. Follow the Leader features numerous guest vocalists, including Ice Cube on "Children of the Korn", Tre Hardson of the Pharcyde on "Cameltosis" and Limp Bizkit's Fred Durst on "All in the Family". The songs for the album were written and copyrighted in 1997, with the exception of "Children of the Korn", "All in the Family" and "Cameltosis", which are copyrighted from 1998.

In a 2013 interview, the band revealed that they partied heavily during the production of Follow the Leader, with massive amounts of alcohol, drugs, and women in the studio. Davis explained further, saying that while recording the vocals for "It's On", there were "people getting blowjobs right behind me, there was girls banging each other in front of me, people getting boned in the closet right behind me, it was the craziest shit I've ever seen in my life and I sang that song." According to Davis, he only agreed to begin tracking vocals when producer Toby Wright met his demands for an eight-ball (a one-eighth ounce of cocaine).

Photography and illustration 
The artwork for Follow the Leader was done by Todd McFarlane Entertainment, with McFarlane and fellow Image Comics artists Greg Capullo (penciller) and Brian Haberlin (colorist) doing the album cover, and designer Brent Ashe handling the graphics work. According to drummer David Silveria, the band got interested in McFarlane after hearing that "Todd had actually referred to us as 'the Doors of the 90's, leading to them recording a song for Spawn, a film based on a comic book by McFarlane, and eventually approaching the artist to make an album cover for them. The cover art depicts a child hopscotching toward the edge of a cliff and a gathering of kids waiting to follow, a concept that began with bassist Reginald "Fieldy" Arvizu and sketched by a friend of Davis before being submitted to McFarlane. It marked the third straight Korn cover featuring children in a disturbing context, which Davis explained by saying that "Children are always scared when they're all happy and stuff. They're the most beautiful thing in the world, but when you see it in our artwork, the way we've placed it, it's just kinda fuckin' weird." The "Freak on a Leash" music video features animated segments by McFarlane featuring this cover art.

Release and promotion 

Korn embarked on a promotional tour for the upcoming album across North America, which began on August 17, 1998, at Tower Records in Los Angeles and ended in early September. Named Korn Kampaign, it was inspired by the styles of political campaigns and press conferences, but instead, these were aimed at fans.

Follow the Leader was released on August 18, 1998, through Immortal/Epic. Follow the Leader is recognized as Korn's mainstream breakthrough, and the album that launched nu metal into the mainstream. 

In the fall of 1998, Korn started the Family Values Tour. According to Arvizu, the tour name was due to "so many of their friends who were like family to us played in bands". The Family Values Tour featured the unveiling of a steel cage to the rear of the stage called the Korn Kage, holding radio contest winners. The idea of the Korn Kage came originally from Arvizu. The tour started on September 22, 1998, ending on October 31, 1998. The tour grossed $6.5 million (6,500,000 in 1999), with an average gross of $240,000 per show and an average attendance per show at 9,000. Korn maintained a generally low ticket price, usually no more than thirty dollars. Korn toured with the band Limp Bizkit, as well as Ice Cube, Orgy, Incubus, and Rammstein. The tour was considered to be a major success, and promoted Follow the Leader to sales that were considered to have "skyrocketed". However, unlike all their other tours, they opted not to play in Europe for this cycle.

The album was also promoted through Concrete Marketing's Concrete Corner program with Jim Rose of Jim Rose Circus as the pitchman.  The promotion saw 100,000 copies of a compilation CD featuring tracks of breakthrough artists approved by Korn, as well as a previously unreleased Korn track, being shrink-wrapped to the album at participating stores and given away for free with each purchase of the album. Band artists (at the time) featured on this CD included Kid Rock, Orgy, Powerman 5000 and Limp Bizkit. The album had five singles issued: "All in the Family", "Got the Life", "Freak on a Leash", "Children of the Korn", and "B.B.K."

In January 1999, Korn participated in the Australian tour of the Big Day Out festival. To continue promoting Follow the Leader, Korn launched a co-headlining US tour with Rob Zombie and Videodrone as the opening act that began on February 26, 1999, through mid-April. The tour was decided between Korn and Zombie as a reconciliation after a dispute due to the latter's non-participation in the Family Values Tour 1998. The tour was named Rock Is Dead and converged with the dates of Marilyn Manson's tour of the same name. In addition, a larger Korn Kage was included onstage, and the tour featured Davis beginning to wear a kilt in live performances. During this tour, Korn's members switched places to perform "Earache My Eye"; guitarists James "Munky" Shaffer and Brian "Head" Welch swapped sides while Davis played the drums and Silveria the bass, and Arvizu took the microphone to sing. Korn and Zombie's Rock Is Dead Tour was a commercial and critical success.

Composition 

Follow the Leader is seventy minutes and eight seconds long. AllMusic said, "They write songs, but those wind up not being nearly as memorable as their lurching metallic hip-hop grind." Entertainment Weekly commented that Follow the Leader was Korn's "gimmick", while saying the album had "steely riffs" and "stomping beats". Tower Records said the album "combines streamlined metal with ominous industrial touches and an undercurrent of hip-hop rhythm," and also said it was an "urban nightmare". The album is considered to be nu metal, but also spans other genres such as alternative metal and rap rock.

The album features 25 tracks, 12 of which last five seconds of silence, making the first 1 minute of the album all silent. The concept of the song "Justin" was about a boy with the same name dying of intestinal cancer. His last wish was to meet the members of Korn. Winston-Salem Journal writer  Ed Bumgardner described Korn's work as having "shaped rap, metal, and punk into a sonic maelstrom that is brutal, aggressive - and reasonably musical".  The Daily News said that "the band shovels chunky beats into an already complex sound..." Michael Mehle of Rocky Mountain News said, "For the uninitiated, the classic Korn sound comes rumbling out of the speakers on the first cut: It's On! grinds fuzzy guitars, thunderous beats, and shouts of gut-wrenching rage into an anthem for the alienated", and gave other positive remarks. The Charlotte Observer said the album was dark, but humble. A Zeeland high school assistant principal said in an interview for a Michigan newspaper that the music is "indecent, vulgar, obscene, and intends to be insulting". She said this after giving a student a one-day suspension for wearing a shirt with Korn on it.

Critical reception 

Follow the Leader received generally positive reviews. Stephen Thomas Erlewine of AllMusic called it "an effective follow-up to their first two alt-metal landmarks." David Fricke of Rolling Stone wrote that Korn "have an ideal record for those long, black days when all you can do is say 'What the Fuck! What the Fuck! What the Fuck!' at bloody murder volume". Yahoo! Music critic Janiss Garza described the album as "intensely tortured and savage as ever", while noting that "in spite of all this distress and suffering, Korn does loosen up". Entertainment Weekly reviewer Jim Farber called it "a big load of dumb fun" and "also incredibly perverse, going to almost laughable lengths to mess with metal cliché", concluding that if "hardly innovative enough to rival the classics of metal, at least Korn's LP gives this once-stagnant style kernels of something new". Jon Pareles from The New York Times said the album was "choppy", describing Davis as "wrestling with self-hatred, violent impulses, parental execration, and a confused sexual identity..." In a negative review, Robert Christgau of The Village Voice said that, although Korn "deny they're metal", they "nevertheless demonstrate that the essence of metal ... is self-obliterating volume and self-aggrandizing display." The album is featured in the book 1001 Albums You Must Hear Before You Die.

Accolades

Commercial performance

Follow the Leader peaked at number one on four charts, including the Billboard 200. Follow the Leader peaked at number five in the United Kingdom. The album received a 5× platinum certification in the United States, as well as a triple platinum in Australia and Canada. Follow the Leader also received a gold certification in the Netherlands. The album was awarded multi-platinum certification for shipments in excess of five million copies, by the RIAA on March 15, 2002.

The album's first charting single, "Got the Life", released on July 24, 1998, peaked at number 15 on the Mainstream Rock Songs chart, and received a gold certification in Australia. The album's next charting single, "Freak on a Leash", released in February 1999, peaked at number six on the Alternative Songs chart, as well as number six on the Bubbling Under Hot 100, and like "Got the Life", received a gold certification in Australia. "Freak on a Leash" was nominated for nine MTV Video Music Awards, and won for the Best Rock Video award, as well as Best Editing.

Track listing 
All songs written by Korn except "Earache My Eye" written by Tommy Chong, Gaye Delorme and Richard Marin. All guest appearances feature an extra writing credit by the guest.

 The original physical release features 25 tracks. The album starts with 12 silent tracks. In interviews, Jonathan Davis also mentioned he was very superstitious and did not want to end an album on track 13.

Personnel 

Korn
 Jonathan Davis – vocals, bagpipes
 Head – guitar
 Munky – guitar
 Fieldy – bass, vocals on "Earache My Eye"
 David Silveria – drums, Bass on "earache my eye"

Additional vocalists
 Fred Durst – on "All in the Family"
 Tre Hardson – on "Cameltosis"
 Ice Cube – on "Children of the Korn"
 Cheech Marin – on "Earache My Eye"

Production staff
 Todd McFarlane and Greg Capullo – artwork
 Brian Haberlin – artwork (coloring)
 Joseph Cultice – photography
 Tommy D. Daugherty – programming
 John Ewing Jr. – engineer, assistant engineer
 Ross Robinson - vocal coaching 
 Stephen Marcussen – mastering
 Brendan O'Brien – mixing
 Steve Thompson – producer
 Don C. Tyler – digital editing
 Justin Z. Walden – additional drums, programming
 Toby Wright – producer, engineer

Charts

Weekly charts

Year-end charts

Singles

Certifications

References

Bibliography 
 
 

1998 albums
Albums produced by Toby Wright
Epic Records albums
Immortal Records albums
Korn albums